Pinki (Hindi: पिंकी) a comics series by Diamond Comics characterizes a five-year-old girl. The Character of Pinki was created by Cartoonist Pran Kumar Sharma in year 1978. The comic is distributed in 10 languages. Pinki is often seen with her pet squirrel named Kut-Kut. The other notable characters in this comic are her neighbor Jhapatji, her friends Bhiku and Champu. Pinki has also appeared in Chacha Chaudhary and Billoo comic books.

Whenever she tries to help her neighbor Jhapatji, she always messes everything and whole neighborhood is scared of her menace doings.

Adaptation
In 2009, Diamond Comics, the owner of characters Chacha Chaudhary, Sabu and Pinki tied up with License India, to bring them to silver screen as animation characters.

References

External links
Pinki webpage at Diamond Comics

Indian comics titles
Indian_comics_characters
Indian comic strips
1978 comics debuts
Comics characters introduced in 1978
Child characters in comics
Hindi-language magazines
Fictional Indian people
Diamond Comics characters